Caleb Smith may refer to:

 Caleb Blood Smith (1808–1864), American journalist and politician
 Caleb Smith (skeleton racer) (born 1983), American skeleton racer
 Caleb Smith (baseball) (born 1991), American baseball pitcher
 Caleb Smith (soccer) (born 1996), American soccer player
 Caleb L. Smith (1829–1890), American builder and politician from New York